Steirastoma breve is a species of beetle in the family Cerambycidae. It was described by Sulzer in 1776.

References

Acanthoderini
Beetles described in 1776
Taxa named by Johann Heinrich Sulzer